Etxebarri, Doneztebeko Elizatea is a town and municipality located in the province of Biscay, in the Autonomous Basque Community, in the North of Spain.

Since 13 January 2005, the name of "Etxebarri, Doneztebeko Elizatea" has been changed officially to "Etxebarri" to simplify the name. It translates as "new home/house" (etxe "home", barri "new"). Prior to the introduction of Standard Basque, the town's name was spelled Echevarri.

Etxebarri has an area of 33.38 square kilometres and a population of 11,563 people (2019), with a density of 346 inhabitants/km2.

Being so close to Bilbao (1.5 kilometres) has had a direct effect on Etxebarri. Until a few decades ago, Etxebarri was a small nucleus in which its rural population worked in industrial areas. Both the population and the industrial land increased considerably because of the congestion of Bilbao and the need for space for the installation of industries. Therefore, there was a significant increase in new population in the locality. In addition, since 2004, the Metro Bilbao underground train has reached Etxebarri. In fact, the threshold stipulated for the town in 2012 is about 10,000 inhabitants. It has a metro station of the Bilbao metro rapid transit service and a train station of the commuter rail service Euskotren Trena.

History

References

External links 
 ETXEBARRI, ANTEIGLESIA DE SAN ESTEBAN - ETXEBARRI DONEZTEBEKO ELIZATEA in the Bernardo Estornés Lasa - Auñamendi Encyclopedia (Euskomedia Fundazioa) 
 Etxebarri city council

Municipalities in Biscay
Estuary of Bilbao